Bartosz Chajdecki (born 28 September 1980, in Kraków) is a Polish composer.

A representative of the young generation of Polish composers, Chajdecki started to compose at 12 and graduated from the Academy of Music in Kraków with distinction. He is best known for his works for feature films and TV series.

He composes soundtracks to major Polish film and TV productions, including Bogowie / Gods, Powstanie Warszawskie / Warsaw Rising, Chce się żyć / Life Feels Good, and Time of honor.

In 2010 he was nominated for the International Film Music Critics Association Award for the best original score for a television series, and in 2011 he won the Transatlantyk Ocean Award for “the most promising composer of the young generation” at the Transatlantyk International Festival of Film and Music in Poznań.

References 

Polish composers
Living people
1980 births